Gett Your Drink On is a studio album originally released on July 15, 1997 by the Washington, D.C.-based go-go band Lil' Benny and the Masters.

Track listing

"I Never Seen a Man Cry"  – 5:13
"Brother to Brother"  – 7:23
"Hope"  – 2:54
"Hit and Run" – 1:46
"Let Me Show You/The Message" – 7:13
"How You Going to Carry It" – 6:20
"Gett on the Wagon" – 6:48
"Bellow-Meso-Bardo"  – 5:06
"Hello"  – 3:53
"Gett Your Drink On"  – 6:54
"Can I Get Down" – 4:37
"Walk"  – 5:50

Personnel

Anthony "Lil Benny" Harley – rapping, trumpet, vocals
Stan Cooper – guitar
Bennie Dancy Jr. – rapping, tenor saxophone, vocals
Glenn Ellis – bass guitar
Milton "Go-Go Mickey" Freeman – percussion
William "Ju-Ju" House – drums  Composer, Drums
Mark Lawson – keyboards, synthesizer
Bryant "Luther" Roberts – vocals
James "Son" Thomas – rapping, background vocals
Kent Wood – keyboards, mixing, synthesizer
Chris Biondo – engineer, mixing
Chuck Brown – guest vocals
James "Jas Funk" – guest vocals

References

1997 albums
Anthony Harley albums